Baqerabad (also Romanized as Bāqerābād; also known as Bāqirābād) is a village in Zalian Rural District, Zalian District, Shazand County, Markazi Province, Iran. At the 2006 census, its population was 32, in 12 families.

References 

Populated places in Shazand County